The Brilliant Bellson Sound is an album by American jazz drummer Louis Bellson featuring performances recorded in 1959 for the Verve label.

Reception

AllMusic awarded the album 3 stars.

Track listing
All compositions by Louis Bellson except as indicated
 "Drum Foolery" - 5:28
 "It's Music Time" - 2:14
 "Blast Off" (Aaron Sachs) - 2:17
 "Don't Be That Way" (Edgar Sampson, Mitchell Parish, Benny Goodman) - 2:31 
 "The Hawk Talks" - 2:33
 "Summer Night" (Harry Warren, Al Dubin) - 2:09
 "Satin Doll" (Duke Ellington, Billy Strayhorn, Johnny Mercer) - 2:53
 "It Don't Mean a Thing (If It Ain't Got That Swing)" (Ellington, Irving Mills) - 2:30 
 "Speak Low" (Kurt Weill, Ogden Nash) - 3:03
 "You Are My Lucky Star" (Nacio Herb Brown, Arthur Freed) - 2:32
 "So Long Blues" - 5:19

Personnel
Louis Bellson – drums
John Audino, Guido Basso, Ralph Clark, Fred Thompson - trumpet
Nick Di Maio, Earl Swope - trombone
Juan Tizol - valve trombone
Joseph De Angelis - French horn
Herb Geller, Oliver Nelson - alto saxophone
George Nicholas - tenor saxophone
Aaron Sachs - tenor saxophone, clarinet
George Perry - baritone saxophone
Lawrence Lucie, Tony Rizzi - guitar
Ed Diamond - piano
Truck Parham - bass
Jack Arnold - boobam
Jack Arnold (track 10), Louis Bellson (track 11), Ed Diamond (track 8), Bob Florence (tracks 5–7), Marty Paich (track 1), Aaron Sachs (track 3), Ernie Wilkins (tracks 2, 4 & 9) - arranger

References

Verve Records albums
Louie Bellson albums
1960 albums
Albums arranged by Bob Florence